Right Royal (1958–1973) was a French Thoroughbred race horse and sire. He was the best two-year-old in France in 1960 when his wins included the Grand Critérium. He was the dominant three-year-old of his generation in Europe in the spring and summer of 1961, winning the Poule d'Essai des Poulains, Prix du Jockey Club and the King George VI and Queen Elizabeth Stakes. Right Royal was defeated in the Prix de l'Arc de Triomphe and was retired to stud where he had some success as a breeding stallion.

Background
Right Royal was a brown horse bred in France by his owner Elisabeth Couturié. He was sired by The Derby winner Owen Tudor out of Bastia, a mare who never won a race and spent most of her racing career acting as a pacemaker for her more talented stable companion Tahiti, the winner of the 1954 Prix de Diane. Couturié sent her colt into training with Etienne Pollet at Chantilly.

Racing career

1960: two-year-old season
Right Royal won three of his four races as a two-year-old. He won the Prix de la Salamandre and the Grand Critérium at Longchamp. At the end of the year he was rated the best colt of his generation in France.

1961: three-year-old season
On his first appearance as a three-year-old, Right Royal was beaten in the Prix de Fontainebleau in April, after being given a questionable ride by Roger Poincelet. He then re-established himself as the best colt in France by winning the Poule d'Essai des Poulains, the Prix Lupin and the Prix du Jockey Club. In the Prix du Jockey Club he won by three lengths from Match at odds of 9/5.

In July, Right Royal was sent to England to contest the King George VI and Queen Elizabeth Stakes in which he was matched against the 1960 Epsom Derby winner St. Paddy. Ridden by Roger Poincelet, he started at odds of 6/4 with St Paddy being made the 4/5 favourite in a race run on rain-softened turf. Right Royal tracked St Paddy until the final furlong when he was moved to the outside and easily accelerated past the English champion, winning by three lengths.

In September, Right Royal returned to Longchamp to win the Prix Foy. A month later, in the Prix de l'Arc de Triomphe, Right Royal started favourite, but finished second of the nineteen runners, beaten two lengths by the Italian colt Molvedo.

Assessment
Right Royal was awarded a rating of 135 by Timeform in 1961.

In 1961, the Bloodstock Breeders' Review conducted their third Horse of the Year poll. Right Royal won the award, taking 50% of the votes.

In their book A Century of Champions, John Randall and Tony Morris rated Right Royal the thirty-second best French horse of the 20th Century.

Stud record
Right Royal had some success as a stallion. He sired the 1969 Irish Derby winner Prince Regent and Salvo, who won the Hardwicke Stakes and the Grosser Preis von Baden and finished second in both the King George and the Arc.

Pedigree

References

1958 racehorse births
Racehorses trained in France
Racehorses bred in France
Thoroughbred family 3-f
Chefs-de-Race
King George VI and Queen Elizabeth Stakes winners